Alessandra Torre is an American novelist best known for contemporary romance. Torre is a New York Times, USA Today, Wall Street Journal and Amazon International bestselling novelist. Alessandra is the Bedroom Blogger for Cosmopolitan. She has been a guest columnist for the Huffington Post, RT Book Reviews, and was featured in Elle Magazine. In 2017, she created Alessandra Torre Ink, an online community for authors, which offers webinars, courses and the Inkers Con conference.

In 2015, her novel The Girl in 6E was optioned for film by EuropaCorp. In 2017, her novel, Hollywood Dirt was released as a full-length movie by PassionFlix.

Standalone novels

 2014:- Black Lies
 2015:- Tight
 2015:- Hollywood Dirt
 2016:- Moonshot
2017:- Love in Lingerie
2017:- Trophy Wife
2017:- Love Chloe
2017:- The Ghostwriter
2018:- Hidden Seams
2018:- Tripping on a Halo
2019:- Undertow
2019:- Filthy Vows
2019:- Twisted Marriage
2020:- The F List

Series
 2012:- The Innocence Trilogy
 2012:- Blindfolded Innocence (The Innocence Trilogy #1)
 2013:- The Diary of Brad De Luca (The Innocence Trilogy #1.5)
 2014:- Masked Innocence (The Innocence Trilogy #2)
 2014:- End of the Innocence (The Innocence Trilogy #3)
 2014:- The Deanna Madden Series
 2014:- The Girl in 6E (The Deanna Madden Series #1)
 2015:- Do Not Disturb (The Deanna Madden Series #2)
 2015:- If You Dare (The Deanna Madden Series #3)
2018:- Even Money (All In Duet #1)
2018:- Double Down (All In Duet #2)
2019:- Filthy Vows (Filthy Vows #1)
2019:- Twisted Marriage (Filthy Vows #2)

Erotica
 2014:- Just the Sex: Erotic Shorts

References

External links
 Official website
 Facebook

American erotica writers
American women novelists
21st-century American novelists
Living people
21st-century American women writers
Year of birth missing (living people)
Place of birth missing (living people)
Women erotica writers